From the Edge of the City is a 1998 Greek film directed by Constantinos Giannaris. It was Greece's official Best Foreign Language Film submission at the 72nd Academy Awards, but did not manage to receive a nomination.

Plot
A company of young Pontic Greeks refugees from Russia live in Menidi, a suburb in the edge of Athens. Sasha, the main character, quits his job and collides with his father. His situation spurs him to chase the easy money, ending up in the dark world of prostitution and drugs.

Cast
Stathis Papadopoulos as Sasha
Theodora Tzimou as Natasha
Costas Kotsianisis as Kotzian
Panagiotis Hartomatzidis as Panagiotis

Reception

Awards
winner:
1998: Greek State Film Awards: for Best Director (Constantinos Giannaris)
1998: Greek State Film Awards: for Best Film (2nd place)
1998: Greek Film Critics Association Awards

nominated:
1998: Thessaloniki International Film Festival: for Golden Alexander

In 1999, the film was Greece's official Best Foreign Language Film submission at the 72nd Academy Awards, but did not manage to receive a nomination.

See also
 List of submissions to the 72nd Academy Awards for Best Foreign Language Film
 List of Greek submissions for the Academy Award for Best Foreign Language Film

References

External links

Greek-language films
Greek LGBT-related films
1990s Russian-language films
Films about prostitution in Greece
1998 films
1990s thriller drama films
Greek thriller drama films
1998 drama films
Films shot in Athens